Les Yeux cernés (English title: Marked Eyes) is a 1964 French thriller film directed by Robert Hossein who wrote the original story. The screenplay was written by Claude Desailly, André Tabet  and Georges Tabet. The film stars Robert Hossein, Michèle Morgan and Marie-France Pisier.

It tells the story of a widow who begins to receive blackmail letters demanding money as almost everybody has disliked her husband in a small town.

External links

1964 films
1960s mystery thriller films
French mystery thriller films
Films set in Austria
1960s French-language films
1960s French films